Bad-tibira (Sumerian: , bad3-tibiraki), "Wall of the Copper Worker(s)", or "Fortress of the Smiths", identified as modern Tell al-Madineh (also Tell Madineh), between Ash Shatrah and Tell as-Senkereh (ancient Larsa) in southern Iraq, was an ancient Sumerian city, which appears among antediluvian cities in the Sumerian King List. Its Akkadian name was Dûr-gurgurri. It was also called  (Pantibiblos) by Greek authors such as Berossus, transmitted by Abydenus and Apollodorus. This may reflect another version of the city's name, Patibira, "Canal of the Smiths".

Bad-tibira in Sumerian literature
According to the Sumerian King List, Bad-tibira was the second city to "exercise kingship" in Sumer before the flood, following Eridu. These kings were said to be En-men-lu-ana, En-men-gal-ana and Dumuzid the Shepherd.

The early Sumerian text Inanna's descent to the netherworld mentions the city's temple, E-mush-kalamma(a temple to Lulal ). In this tale, Inanna dissuades demons from the netherworld from taking Lulal, patron of Bad-tibira, who was living in squalor.  They eventually take Dumuzid, who lived in palatial opulence at Uruk. This Dumuzid is called "the Shepherd", who on the King List resides at Bad-Tibira in contrast to the post-diluvian Dumuzid, the Fisherman, who reigns in Uruk.

History
The "brotherhood text" in cuneiform inscriptions on cones plundered from the site in the 1930s records the friendship pact of Entemena, governor of Lagash, and Lugal-kinishedudu, governor of Uruk. It identifies Entemena as the builder of the temple E-mush to Inanna and Dumuzid, under his local epithet Lugal-E-mush. In the Isin-Larsa Period possession of the city passed between Larsa, whose king Sin-Iddinam claims to have built the great wall of Bad-tibira, and Isin, whose king Lipit-Ishtar, "the shepherd of Nippur", claimed to have built the "House of Righteousness" there. The city was under the control of Larsa during the long reign of Rim-Sîn I.

Archaeology
The site was visited in 1927 by Raymond P. Dougherty for a day. He reports that the site covered about a square mile with the western mound being the largest with low extensions bearing off a mile to the north. Numbers baked bricks were seen along with door sockets, flint saw blades, and a bronze needle.
Some badly effaced half-bricks on the surface of the mound bore the inscription of Amar-Sin, of the Third Dynasty of Ur. Pieces of vitrified brick scattered over the surface of the large mound bore witness to the city's destruction by fire.

See also
List of cities of the ancient Near East

Notes

Further reading
W.F. Leemans, Tablets from Bad-tibira and Samsuiluna's Reconquest of the South, JEOL, vol. 15, pp. 214–218, 1957/58

External links
Translation of Inana's descent to the nether world
Foundation Peg of Entemena found at presumed site of Bad-tibara - British Museum

Sumerian cities
Archaeological sites in Iraq
Former populated places in Iraq
Dhi Qar Governorate
Former kingdoms